Rahir Point is a point marking the northeast end of a small peninsula which extends into Flandres Bay just north of Thomson Cove, on the northeast coast of Kyiv Peninsula, Graham Land. First charted by the Belgian Antarctic Expedition under Gerlache, 1897–99, and named "Cap Rahir," probably for Maurice Rahir, Belgian geographer and member of the Belgian Royal Geographical Society.

References
 SCAR Composite Gazetteer of Antarctica.

Headlands of Graham Land
Danco Coast